Robert Rosenkranz (born August 5, 1942) is an American philanthropist and the chairman of Delphi Capital Management, an investment concern with over $35 billion in assets under management, and the founder of a group of investment and private equity partnerships. From 1987 until 2018 he was the chief executive officer (CEO) of Delphi Financial Group, an insurance company with more than $20 billion in assets. Delphi grew from one of his acquisitions and increased its value 100-fold under his leadership.

A graduate of Yale (summa cum laude) and Harvard Law School, he spent his early career as an economist with the RAND Corporation, where he was engaged in research on foreign policy issues and municipal finance.

He is the founder and chairman of Intelligence Squared U.S. Debates, a public policy debate series that provides a forum for reasoned public discourse Intelligence Squared. He serves on the board of directors for the Manhattan Institute, the Whitney Museum of American Art in New York, the Hoover Institution at Stanford University in California, and the Serpentine Galleries and Policy Exchange, the center-right think tank, in London. He is also a member of the Council on Foreign Relations  and of the Visiting Committees for the Departments of Photography and Asian Art at The Metropolitan Museum of Art.

Philanthropy
In 1985, Rosenkranz founded the Rosenkranz Foundation with the mission of encouraging fresh perspectives and innovation in public policy, higher education and the arts.  One initiative of the foundation is the debate series Intelligence Squared U.S. Debates, established in New York City in 2006.  A live event in New York, Intelligence Squared U.S. Debates is broadcast nationally by National Public Radio and televised by Bloomberg TV. 

In late 2009, Yale University dedicated its new building, Rosenkranz Hall, in recognition of Rosenkranz's philanthropic work. Rosenkranz Hall is home to Yale's social sciences and international studies departments.

In April 2010, Rosenkranz was honored by the Manhattan Institute with their annual Alexander Hamilton Award, which he received in recognition of his founding of the Intelligence Squared U.S. debate series.

The Rosenkranz Foundation also endowed Yale's Rosenkranz Writer-in-Residence program, funded several exhibitions at the Guggenheim Museum  and promoted Chinese art by sponsoring a major exhibit on Mu Xin donating a large collection to Harvard University, and funded a book series on modern Chinese art by Yale University Press.

Intelligence Squared U.S. debates and public policy

Rosenkranz founded Intelligence Squared U.S. Debates in 2006, a live debate series with the goal of raising the level of public discourse and promoting a realization that, on contentious issues, those who challenge the conventional wisdom have intellectually respectable and often persuasive viewpoints.  Through an annual series of between 10 and 12 live Oxford-style debates, IQ2US brings together thought-leaders and audiences together around public policy and cultural issues. The program has been the subject of articles in The New York Times, The New Yorker, and many other publications.

Moderated by ABC's John Donvan, panelists have included Arianna Huffington, P. J. O'Rourke, Karl Rove, David Brooks, Mort Zuckerman, Wesley Clark, Bernard-Henri Lévy and many others.
  
Rosenkranz writes about public policy and finance for the Huffington Post, and The Wall Street Journal.  He is also an investment contributor to Forbes.

Personal life
Rosenkranz lives in East Hampton.  He has two children from a marriage to Margret Hill (June 20, 1940 - September 27, 2018) which ended in divorce: Nicholas Quinn Rosenkranz and Stephanie Rosenkranz Hessler, both constitutional law scholars.  Since June 29, 2002 he has been married to Alexandra Munroe, Ph.D., Senior Curator of Asian Art at the Guggenheim Museum. He is Jewish, but his second marriage was officiated at a Presbyterian church.

Notes

External links
Official Blog

Living people
1942 births
Harvard Law School alumni
Philanthropists from New York (state)
American chief executives of financial services companies
Jewish American philanthropists
Yale University alumni
People from Manhattan
20th-century American Jews
21st-century American Jews